The Saltoro Mountains are a subrange of the Karakoram Range. They are located in the southeast Karakoram on the southwest side of the Siachen Glacier, one of the two longest glaciers outside the polar regions.  The name given to this range is shared with the Saltoro Valley which is located to the west of this range, downslope on the Pakistan side of the Saltoro Range which generally follows the Actual Ground Position Line. Saltoro Kangri peak, Saltoro River, and Saltoro Valley are features on this range. The Actual Ground Position Line (AGPL) between Indian and Pakistan held area runs through this range, where the high peaks and passes of the Siachen area are held by India, whereas Pakistan occupies the lower peaks and valleys to the west.

The Saltoro Mountains are Lesser Karakorams on the southwestern side of the large Karakoram-glaciers (Siachen, Baltoro, Biafo and Hispar Glacier from east to west) while the main ridge of the Karakorams lies northeast of these glaciers. The subranges of the main ridges are generally called Muztagh whereas the mountain groups of the Lesser Karakorams are denominated as mountains, ranges or groups.

The Saltoro Range is claimed as part of Ladakh by India and as part of Gilgit–Baltistan by Pakistan.  Between 1984 and 1987, India assumed military control of the main peaks and passes of the range, with Pakistani forces holding the glacial valleys just to the west. Hence, despite high peaks and dramatic climbing opportunities, they are little visited except by military forces due to the ongoing Siachen Conflict.

On the southwest side, the Saltoro Mountains drop steeply to the valleys of the Kondus and Dansam Rivers, which join to form the Saltoro River, a tributary of the Shyok River. This in turn flows into the Indus River. To the northwest, the Kondus Glacier separates the range from the neighboring Masherbrum Mountains, while on the southeast, the Gyong River, Glacier, and Pass (Gyong La) separate the northern Saltoro Mountains from the southern Saltoro Mountains or "Kailas Mountains" (not to be confused with Tibet's sacred Mount Kailash).

Background

Indo-Pakistan borders: SC, IB, LOC, AGPL 

The actual India-Pakistan boundary is divided into 4 types of borders: disputed Sir Creek (SC) riverine border, mutually agreed India–Pakistan International Border (IB) from north of Sir Creek to north of Dhalan near Jammu, Line of Control (LoC) across disputed Kashmir and Ladakh regions from north of Dhalan in India and west of Chicken's Neck in Pakistan to Point NJ9842, and Actual Ground Position Line (AGPL) across Siachen from Point NJ9842 to Indira Col West. Siachen lies south of the Shaksgam ceded by Pakistan to China via the 1963 Sino-Pakistan Agreement but also claimed by India and Aksai Chin held by China since 1962 but also claimed by India. The Shaksgam Tract controlled by China is located north of the Saltoro mountain range from the Apsarasas Kangri Range to 90 km northwest of K2.

AGPL 
The AGPL runs roughly along the Saltoro Mountains from Point NJ9842 on the India-Pakistan LoC to near La Yongma Ri, Gyong La, Gyong Kangri, Chumik Kangri, Bilafond La (pass) and nearby Bana Post, Saltoro Kangri, Ghent Kangri, and Sia La to the India–Pakistan–China trijunction northwest of Indira Col West on the Sino-Indian LAC. The peaks and passes under Pakistan's control such as Gayari Camp, Chogolisa, Baltoro Glacier, Conway Saddle, Baltoro Muztagh, and Gasherbrum lie west of the AGPL.

Selected peaks
(This is a common criterion for peaks of this stature to be independent.)

See also

 Borders
 Actual Ground Position Line (AGPL)
 India–Pakistan International Border (IB)
 Line of Control (LoC)
 Line of Actual Control (LAC)
 Sir Creek (SC)
 Borders of China
 Borders of India
 Borders of Pakistan

 Conflicts
 Kashmir conflict
 Siachen conflict
 Sino-Indian conflict
 List of disputed territories of China
 List of disputed territories of India
 List of disputed territories of Pakistan
 Northern Areas
 Trans-Karakoram Tract

 Operations
 Operation Meghdoot 1984 in Siachen, by India
 Operation Rajiv 1987 in Siachen, by India
 Operation Safed Sagar 1999 in Kargil War, by India

 Other related topics
 Awards and decorations of the Indian Armed Forces
 Bana Singh, after whom Quaid Post was renamed to Bana Top 
 Dafdar, westernmost town in Trans-Karakoram Tract
 India-China Border Roads
 Sino-Pakistan Agreement for transfer of Trans-Karakoram Tract to China

References

Sources
 Jerzy Wala, Geographical Sketch Map of the Karakoram, Swiss Foundation for Alpine Research, Zurich, 1990.

Mountain ranges of India
Landforms of Jammu and Kashmir
Mountain ranges of the Karakoram
Baltistan
Mountain ranges of Gilgit-Baltistan